Sibley and Holmwood Candy Factory and Witkop and Holmes Headquarters, also known as the Weed & Company Building, are two connected historic commercial buildings located in downtown Buffalo, Erie County, New York. The Sibley & Holmwood Candy Factory (149 Swan Street) was built in 1896 and is a five-story, nine-bay-wide brick commercial block with late-Gothic detailing. It features Gothic window arches, decorative cast-iron columns on the storefront, and corbelled cornice. The Witkop & Holmes Headquarters (145 Swan Street) was designed by the architectural firm Bethune, Bethune & Fuchs and built in 1901.  It is a four-story, three-bay-wide brick commercial block. Both buildings have flat roofs. The building has been renovated to house loft apartments.

It was listed on the National Register of Historic Places in 2014.

References

External links
Apartments @ the Hub
Buffalo Rising: Apartments Planned for Historic Swan Street Properties, Nov 8, 2012
Buffalo Rising: Construction Watch: 145 & 149 Swan Street… and Handle Bar @ The Hub pub!

Gallery 

Industrial buildings and structures on the National Register of Historic Places in New York (state)
Gothic Revival architecture in New York (state)
Industrial buildings completed in 1901
Buildings and structures in Buffalo, New York
National Register of Historic Places in Buffalo, New York
Confectionery industry